The Point of Sangomar is a sand spit located on the Atlantic Ocean at the mouth of the Saloum Delta, which marks the end of the Petite Côte west of Senegal.

This narrow sandbar extends south about twenty kilometers from Palmarin Diakhanor. Long threatened by coastal erosion, the fragile cord was again broken by a tidal wave in 1987, giving birth to the island of Sangomar. The gap between this new island and the point where the village of Djifer is found continues to widen.

Geomorphology and environmental 

The rupture in Sangomar is the result of a natural process for the past few thousand years, which has also been noticed by sailors.

In 1891, it was found that the gap had widened  from 25 to 30m since 1886. In the twentieth century, several breaks were reported including: 1909, 1928, 1960, 1970, etc.

The latest occurred on 27 February 1987 at a place called Lagoba. A year later, the gap was reported to be 1 km wide, and ten years later, about 4 km. Several camps and buildings were destroyed. The fish packing plant at  Djifer was closed in 1996. The village located 4 km north of the first breakpoint is increasingly threatened and authorities are considering the evacuation of its inhabitants to the new port of Diakhanor.

All these phenomena are closely followed by a body established with the support of UNESCO in 1984, the multidisciplinary team that studies coastal ecosystems (EPEEC).

History 

The Point of Sangomar has also been long described by navigators and hydrographers because of its bar and because of its strategic location downstream of the port of Kaolack, an important production center for peanuts and salt.

In the mid-nineteenth century, Louis Faidherbe, the Governor of Senegal, tried to take control of the peanut producing countries and those encircling the Cayor. In May 1858, he made an expedition directed in particular to the Kingdom of Sine. To consolidate the French position, as in Rufisque (Cayor), Saly (Baol), Kaolack (Saloum) and Joal-Fadiouth (Kingdom of Sine), a fort was built at Sangomar. In 1890, a customs post was built there.

Toponymy 

According to Henry Gravrand, the word "Sangomar" among the Serer people means "the village of shadows" (the "Elysiums").

Religious significance

In the Serer religion, the Point of Sangomar is a place believed to be a gathering place for pangool. The local population continue to visit this island to venerate ancestors. It is a Serer place of worship and one of the most sacred places in Serer religion. Serer and Jola tradition speak of an ancient legend commonly referred to as the legend of Jambooñ and Agaire.  According to this legend, two sisters (Jambooñ and Agaire) boarded a pirogue along with their parties. The boat broke in two at the Point of Sangomar. Those who survived and headed north were the ancestors of the Serer people, and those who headed south became the ancestors of the Jola.

"Sangomar, a Serer place of worship, at Palmarin" appears on the List of monuments and historical sites in Senegal.

Notes

External links
 J. Bouteiller, De Saint-Louis à Sierra-Leone. Huit ans de navigation dans les rivières du Sud, A. Challamel, Paris, 1891  (see chapter V, « De Gorée à la barre de Saloum », p. 193, & chapter VI, « De Rufisque à San-Gomar », p. 203)
Gabriela Ackermann, Frédéric Alexandre, Julien Andrieu, Catherine Mering et Claire Ollivier, « Dynamique des paysages et perspectives de développement durable sur la Petite Côte et dans le delta du Sine–Saloum (Sénégal) », in Vertigo, vol. 7, n°. 2, September 2006
 « Sites mythiques du Sénégal : Sangomar, ses merveilles et ses mystères » (Le Soleil, 13 August 2008, p. 9-11)

Serer holy places
Landforms of Senegal
Fatick Region
Shoals of Africa